Axel Bassani (born 24 July 1999) is an Italian motorcycle racer competing in the Superbike World Championship aboard a Ducati Panigale V4 with Team Motocorsa Racing since 2021.   

In 2022 he won the trophy for Best Independent rider. He was the FIM Europe Supersport Cup winner in 2016.  

He previously raced in the Supersport World Championship and in Moto2.

Career

Early career 
In 2015 he competed in the final two races of the European Superstock 600 Championship on a Kawasaki ZX-6R with the team Berclaz Racing, achieving a second place finish in the final round in France and finishing the championship in 15th place. 

In 2016 he joined the Supersport World Championship on a Kawasaki ZX-6R with San Carlo Team Italia, finishing 1st in the FIM Europe Cup and 12th overall.

In 2017 he joined the Moto2 World Championship but split with his team after the first four races. He then went back to the Supersport World Championship and raced in Italy and Spain as a substitute rider.

In 2018 he competed in the Campionato Italiano Velocità (CIV) on a BMW S1000RR with the team DMR Racing. He finished 5th overall and achieved a podium finish. 

He continued competing in the same class in 2019, on a Yamaha YZF-R1 with the team Yamaha Motoxracing. He finished 8th overall and achieved two podium finishes.

In 2020 he went back to the Supersport World Championship, on a Yamaha YZF-R6 with the team Soradis Yamaha Motoxracing, finishing 17th overall.

Superbike World Championship 
In 2021 Bassani joined the Superbike World Championship on a Ducati Panigale V4 R with the team Motocorsa Racing. His best result was a 2nd place finish in Catalunya. He finished 2nd in the independent trophy and 9th overall.

He continued racing for team Motocorsa Racing in 2022, achieving three podium finishes throughout the season, winning the independent trophy and finishing 7th overall.

Career statistics

Supersport World Championship

Races by year
(key) (Races in bold indicate pole position; races in italics indicate fastest lap)

Grand Prix motorcycle racing

By season

Races by year
(key) (Races in bold indicate pole position; races in italics indicate fastest lap)

Superbike World Championship

Races by year
(key) (Races in bold indicate pole position; races in italics indicate fastest lap)

References

External links
 

1999 births
Living people
Italian motorcycle racers
Moto2 World Championship riders
Supersport World Championship riders
People from Feltre
Superbike World Championship riders
Sportspeople from the Province of Belluno